"Give Me a Reason" is a song by Irish pop rock group the Corrs. It was released in February 2001 as the third single taken from their third studio album In Blue (2000). The song was written and produced by the Corrs. "Give Me a Reason" is a dance-pop song, and received favourable reviews from music critics. The song reached number 27 in the United Kingdom and number 13 in New Zealand.

Background and release
"Give Me a Reason" was released as the third single from In Blue (2000) in February 2001. The CD single included two versions of "Give Me a Reason" (the album version and the Cutfather & Joe remix, which was used for the music video), a "Live Instrumental" version of "Paddy McCarthy" and a "Live" version of "Queen of Hollywood". "Give Me a Reason" was written and produced by the Corrs (Andrea, Caroline, Sharon and Jim). The dance-pop song has Andrea on the centre speaker with the backing vocals on the other speakers. The song was included on their 2001 compilation album, Best of The Corrs.

Music video
The official music video for the song features the members in a large building, doing different things. It also has a horse running past Andrea in a hallway. It is a much glossier video than most of their previous videos. It was banned in some countries due to the scene where Jim throws a chair out of a window, breaking it.

Reception

Critical response
The song received favourable reviews from music critics. For Lydia Vanderloo of Barnes & Nobles, "Songs such as the defiant 'Give Me a Reason' use the subtle, graceful strains of these lovely instruments without throwing their finely calibrated pop songs out of whack." Kevin Oliver of PopMatters commented, " On the upbeat dance numbers like, 'Give Me a Reason', this bolsters the band's previously thin-sounding pop."

Commercial performance
In the United Kingdom, "Give Me a Reason" reached number 27 on the UK Singles Chart, becoming the Corrs' ninth top-40 single there. In New Zealand, it debuted at number 40 on the RIANZ Singles Chart on the week of 1 April 2001 and peaked at number 13 on 27 May 2001.

Track listings

UK and European CD single
 "Give Me a Reason" (Cutfather & Joe remix) – 3:10
 "Give Me a Reason" (album version) – 3:30
 "Rebel Heart" (remix) – 4:35

European maxi-CD single
 "Give Me a Reason" (Cutfather & Joe remix) – 3:10
 "Give Me a Reason" (album version) – 3:30
 "Paddy McCarthy" (live instrumental) – 4:16
 "Queen of Hollywood" (live) – 5:05

Australian CD single
 "Give Me a Reason" (Cutfather & Joe remix) – 3:10
 "Give Me a Reason" (album version) – 3:30
 "Paddy McCarthy" (live instrumental) – 4:16
 "Irresistible" (album version) – 3:40

Credits and personnel
Credits are taken from the UK CD single liner notes and the In Blue album booklet.

Studios
 Recorded at Westland Studio (Dublin, Ireland)
 Mixed at The Record Plant (Los Angeles)
 Mastered at Gateway Mastering (Portland, Maine, US)

Personnel

 The Corrs – writing, production
 Andrea Corr – lead vocals, tin whistle
 Caroline Corr – vocals, drums, bodhrán, percussion
 Sharon Corr – vocals, violin
 Jim Corr – vocals, guitar, keyboards
 Keith Duffy – bass guitar
 Tim Martin – recording
 Mike Shipley – mixing

 Bob Ludwig – mastering
 Cutfather & Joe – additional production (Cutfather & Joe remix)
 Mads Nilsson – mixing (Cutfather & Joe remix)
 Elizabeth Barrett – art direction
 Andrea Brooks – art direction, design
 Rankin – cover photography
 Norman Jean Roy – inlay photography

Charts

Release history

References

143 Records singles
2001 singles
2000 songs
Atlantic Records singles
The Corrs songs
Lava Records singles
Songs written by Andrea Corr
Songs written by Caroline Corr
Songs written by Jim Corr
Songs written by Sharon Corr